Barishal Division is one of the eight administrative divisions of Bangladesh. It is the least populous Division within the entirety of Bangladesh. It is bounded by Dhaka Division on the north, the Bay of Bengal on the south, Chittagong Division on the east and Khulna Division on the west. The administrative capital, Barisal city, lies in the Padma River delta on an offshoot of the Arial Khan River. Barisal division is criss-crossed by numerous rivers that earned it the nickname Dhan-Nodi-Khal, Ei tin-e Borishal (rice, river and canal built Barishal).

History

Early Middle Ages 

In early times the Barisal region was composed of an amalgamation of marshlands formed by the merging of islands brought into existence and built up by alluvial soils washed down the great channels of the combined Brahmaputra-Ganges-Meghna river systems.

In the early 13th century, Muhammad bin Bakhtiyar Khalji led the Muslim conquest of Barisal, and soon later Muhammad bin Tughluq completely conquered eastern Bengal. The Hindu chieftains from northwest Bengal were dislodged from power and they dispersed over Barisal region and founded the kingdom of Bakla.

During the Mughal intervention in Bengal, Hindu society was concentrated to northern and western Barisal (known as Bakarganj). Barisal's southern portion was still covered by forests and laced with lagoons. The northwest was also the only part of Bakarganj where the Hindu population exceeded Muslims in early British censuses.

Mughal period

Barisal saw a second wave of immigration in the late 17th and early 18th centuries. This time, it was Muslim pioneers who assumed the leading role. Establishing Dhaka as the provincial Mughal capital of the region, in the early 17th century the Barisal region (known as Sarkar Bakla to Mughals) was more accessible to businessmen and developers than at any previous time. However, piracy in this region along the coasts and rivers of southeastern Bengal by Arakanese and renegade Portuguese seamen inhibited any sustained attempts by Mughal governors to push into the Barisal forests.

After 1666, when Mughal naval forces cleared the Meghna estuary of such external threats, the Barisal interior lay ripe for colonization. Land developers acquired grants of plots of land, taluq (তালুক), from provincial authorities. Abundant and easily obtainable by purchase from the late 17th century these grants tended to be regarded by their possessors taluqdar (তালুকদার).  As taluqdars brought their taluqs into agricultural production, these men passed up the land revenue through a class of non-cultivating intermediaries, or zamindar (জমিদার).  Zamindars typically resided in the provincial capital, where they had ready access to the chief provincial revenue officer, or dewan (দেওয়ান).

In a second pattern of land development, Muslim pirs or Qazi went directly into uncultivated regions, organized the local population for clearing the jungles, and only later, after having established themselves as local men of influence, entered into relations with the Mughal authorities. Relationships between the religious Muslim pirs and Mughal authorities was not always harmonious, since a pir's natural ties of authority and patronage generally lay with the masses of peasants beneath him and not with the governors and bureaucrats. For example, in remote Jhalakati Thana in the eastern Bakarganj many of 18th-century pirs and Educationist, Islamic scholars came under the authority, among them named Saiyid Faqir and Faizus Ahmed Khan (A Persian business man and educationist, came for the business trade through Khyber pass and spread education among the Indian sub continent) from  wielded enormous influence with the cultivators of the all-Muslim village of Saiyidpur, Hizla and Muladi named after the pirs. But a difficulty arose, noted a 1906 village survey of Pir Fakir of Saiyidpur village, because "the people of this part looked upon the Fakir as their guide and did not pay rent to the Nawab." In this situation, one Lala Chet Singh, a captain in the employ of the governor, "succeeded in persuading the Fakir to leave the country."

British rule 

In 1797 the area was established as Bakerganj District but later renamed as Barisal District and Pir of Hizla-Muladi, Faizus Ahmed Khan stayed back & settled in Muladi-Hizla village.

Pakistani rule 

In 1947 the area was continued as a Bakerganj District, as one of four districts of Khulna Division but later renamed as Barisal District.

Bangladesh 

The Greater Barisal region (Barisal District along with five other neighbouring districts) was created as Barisal Division on 1 January 1993.

Economy 
Barisal is known as the "Granary of Bengal" for its rice production. It is still an important rice-producing area of the country. Since the Middle Ages, Barisal has acted as a trans-shipment center for hides, rice, dried beans, dried peas, lentils, chickpeas, and other legumes for Bengal. Bakery, textile, and pharmaceutical products are the output of a few industrial installations.  There are Sher-e Bangla Medical College (affiliated with the National University) and B. M. College (an educational institution of Barisal Division established in 1889). Barisal is also a river port once connecting Calcutta-Barisal-Dhaka and many other routes. Today Barisal River port is the most important hub of steamer and motor launch service of the Southern Bangladesh.

Points of interest 

Kuakata beach is the main tourist spot in the division. It is one of the two sea beaches in South Asia where both sunrise and sunset at sea can be seen.

Durga Sagar is a man-made pond where a number of migratory birds arrive every winter.

Administration

The division is subdivided into six districts (zilas) and thence into 42 sub-districts (upazilas; Rangabali in Patuakhali and Taltoli in Barguna being the most recent). Lower level administrative areas are 353 union parishads, 3,159 mouzas, 12 municipalities, 25 wards and 4,163 villages.

Transport 
Numerous rivers and canals force the inhabitants to use boats as the main medium of transportation. The main rivers are the Arial Khan, Bishkhali, Burishwar, Tentulia, Paira, Haringhata, Baleshwar, Kirtankhola, Katcha, and Agunmukha.
It is linked by steamer with Dhaka ( to the north) and with Chittagong to the southeast. Road communication has improved significantly over last decades with the building of many bridges. The Barisal airport has regular service to Dhaka.

Education

Barisal Division has the highest literacy rate (age 7 and over) of any division in the country, 65.7% as of the 2011 Bangladesh census.

There are two public universities in the division: Patuakhali Science and Technology University, founded in 2002, and University of Barisal (2011). There are also three private universities: Global University Bangladesh, University of Global Village, and Trust University Barisal, although as of 2018 the last had no enrolled students. There are 258 colleges in the division. They include: Barisal Government Women's College, Brojomohun College (1889), Government Barisal College, Government Syed Hatem Ali College, and Syed Bazlul Haque College.

The division also contains specialized tertiary educational institutions: two medical schools: Patuakhali Medical College (2014) and Sher e Bangla Medical College (1968); three law colleges; four teacher training colleges; three polytechnic institutes; two textile colleges, including Shaheed Abdur Rab Serniabat Textile Engineering College; engineering college Barisal Engineering College, and military school Barishal Cadet College.

Religion 

Islam is the predominant religion in the Barisal division, with a large minority population of Hindus, and small populations of Christians and Buddhists, and others.

Notable residents 

 

 Abul Hasanat Abdullah is a Bangladesh Awami League politician and a member of Parliament.
 Mohiuddin Ahmed  was a Language Movement veteran and 1971 Liberation War organiser.
 Tania Ahmed, actress
 Tofail Ahmed, Bangladeshi politician, Minister of Commerce and Minister of Industries
 Ziauddin Ahmed, war hero, freedom fighter and sub-sector Commander under Sector 9 of Mukti Bahini during Bangladesh liberation war in 1971.
 Jewel Aich, a Bangladeshi magician and bansuri player. He is a veteran of the 1971 Bangladesh liberation war.
 Mir Maswood Ali, mathematician and statistician
 Amir Hossain Amu, a Bangladeshi politician and leader in the Bangladesh Awami League. 
 Abdur Rahman Biswas, former President of Bangladesh
 Anil Biswas noted Hindi and Bengali film song composer
 Mohammad Ali Bogra, Bengali politician, statesman, who served as third Prime Minister of Pakistan,  1953 – 1955.
 Abala Bose, social reformer and wife of Jagadish Chandra Bose
Nachiketa Chakraborty, famous Tollywood singer's family hails from Chechri Rampur village in Kathalia Upazila
 Abdul Gaffar Choudhury, an author, columnist, lyricist.
 Asad Chowdhury, poet, writer, translator, radio, television personality and journalist, as well as a cultural activist in Bangladesh.
 Jibanananda Das, poet
 Kusumkumari Das, poet and mother of Jibanananda Das
 Mukunda Das, was a Bengali poet, ballad singer, composer and patriot, who contributed to the spread of Swadeshi movement in rural Bengal. 
 Gurudas Dasgupta, is a Member of the Indian Parliament and a leader of the Communist Party of India.
 Basudeb DasSarma, chemist
 Arundhati Devi, was an Indian actress, director and writer who is known for her work in Bengali cinema.
 Utpal Dutt, Indian actor, director and writer-playwright
 Aswini Kumar Dutta, social reformer and philanthropist
 Narayan Gangopadhyay, was a Bengali novelist, poet, essayist, and short story writer, a leading writer of modern Bengali literature.
 Sohag Gazi, Bangladeshi cricketer
 Debaprasad Ghosh, an Indian mathematician, linguist, lawyer, journalist, educationist and statesman.
 Nikhil Ghosh, was an Indian musician, teacher and writer, known his proficiency on the percussion instrument of tabla.
 Pannalal Ghosh, musician and flutist
 Parul Ghosh, was an Indian playback singer. Ghosh sang in Hindi and Bengali movies from 1935 to 1951.
 Jyotirmoy Guhathakurta, Bengali educator and humanist of East Pakistan, now Bangladesh. One of the Bengali intellectuals killed by the Pakistan Army during the 1971 Dhaka University massacre on 25 March 1971.
 Hiranmay Sen Gupta, physicist
 Ahsan Habib, Ahsan Habib was a Bangladeshi poet and literary figure in Bengali culture.
 A. M. Harun-ar-Rashid, is a Bangladeshi physicist and Bose Professor of Physics at the University of Dhaka.
 Abul Hasan, poet, journalist and literary figure in Bengali culture
 Ehsan Hoque, medical doctor, social entrepreneur and child rights activist. He is the founder and honorary Executive Director of Distressed Children & Infants International
 Mainul Hosein, lawyer and the printer and publisher of daily newspaper The New Nation. Previously, he was the chairman of the editorial board of The Daily Ittefaq.
 Kamal Hossain, Bangladeshi jurist, statesman and freedom fighter. After the independence of Bangladesh, he served as Minister of Law from 1972 to 1973 and as Minister of Foreign Affairs from 1973 to 1975.
 A.K. Fazlul Huq, Bengali lawyer, legislator and statesman in the 20th century. Huq was a major political figure in British India and later in Pakistan.
 Mohiuddin Jahangir (Bir Shreshto), a freedom fighter
 Major M. A. Jalil, the commander of the Sector 9 during Bangladesh War of Liberation in 1971.
 Shamsuddin Abul Kalam, was an actor and an author of Bengali literature in Bangladesh.
 Mostafa Kamal (Bir Shreshto), a freedom fighter.
 Sufia Kamal, poet
 Fazlul Karim, scholar, academic, philosopher and essayist in Bangladesh.
 Mosharraf Karim, actor
 A.Z.M. Enayetullah Khan, veteran journalist, former minister of Bangladesh. He founded the weekly newspaper Holiday and the daily newspaper New Age. He served as the minister from 1977 to 1978.
 Abdul Jabbar Khan, the 6th Speaker of the National Assembly of Pakistan.
 Abdul Karim Khan folk-singer
 Sadek Khan, Bangladeshi journalist, columnist and filmmaker
 Salman Khan, founder of Khan Academy
 Nazia Khanum, academic and management consultant
 Abdul Latif Singer, musician, and lyricist. He was the initial composer of the Bengali language movement song, "Amaar Bhaiyer Rakte Rangano Ekushey February".
 Altaf Mahmud noted Bengali film song composer. He was the final composer of the Bengali language movement song, "Amaar Bhaiyer Rakte Rangano Ekushey February".
 Anwar Hossain Manju, Bangladeshi politician who is a member of Jatiyo Sangshad representing Pirojpur-2 parliamentary constituency and the current Minister of Water Resources.
 Naziur Rahman Manzur, Bangladesh Jatiya Party politician, founding chairman of the party, former government minister in the Cabinet of Hussain Mohammad Ershad and former Mayor of Dhaka.
 Hasan Masood, a Bangladeshi actor. He is also a former journalist and military officer.
 Aroj Ali Matubbar, astronomer and philosopher
 Rashed Khan Menon, Bangladeshi politician. Chairman of Workers Party of Bangladesh and was elected as the Member of Parliament for Dhaka-8 in 2008 and reelected in 2014.
 Tofazzal Hossain Manik Miah, founder editor of The Daily Ittefaq
 Khalid Hassan Milu, was a Bangladeshi singer.
 Mehedi Hasan Miraz, Bangladeshi cricketer
 Ghulam Murshid, author, scholar and journalist, based on London
 Golam Mustafa, film actor
 Suborna Mustafa, actress
 Shahriar Nafees, Bangladeshi cricketer
 Jahangir Kabir Nanak, Bangladesh Awami League politician and the former state Minister of Local Government, Rural Development and Co-operatives.
 Abu Zafar Obaidullah, poet
 Shahjahan Omar, Bangladesh Nationalist Party politician and the former State Minister for law. He is retired Major of the Bangladesh Army and was awarded Bir Uttam. 
 Andaleeve Rahman, president of Bangladesh Jatiya Party, a member of Parliament, and the principal of British School of Law in Dhaka.
 Bazlur Rahman, Sangbad editor Bazlur Rahman, was a beacon of Bangladesh journalism.
 Selima Rahman, Bangladesh Nationalist Party politician. She served as a state minister at the Ministry of Cultural Affairs of the Government of Bangladesh 2001–2006.
 Sohel Rana, a Bangladeshi film actor, director and producer.
 Nasreen Jahan Ratna, Member of Parliament
 Sudhir Ray,  Indian politician. He was elected to the Lok Sabha, he was a member of the Communist Party of India (Marxist).
 Amal Kumar Raychaudhuri, physicist
 Tapan Raychaudhuri, historian
 Kamini Roy, poet and first woman graduate with honours in the subcontinent.
 Mir Sabbir, actor
 Hanif Sanket, TV presenter, entertainer, writer and producer
 Golam Sarwar, journalist, writer and the founding editor of Samakal and Jugantor. He was awarded Ekushey Padak by the Government of Bangladesh in 2014.
 Papia Sarwar, is a Bangladeshi singer. She is an exponent of Rabindra Sangeet. She earned Rabindra Award from Bangla Academy in 2013.
 Delwar Hossain Sayeedi, Bangladeshi Islamic scholar, speaker and politician and convicted war criminal of the Bangladesh liberation war.
 Manikuntala Sen, revolutionary
 Nikhil Sen, dramatist
 Mihir Sengupta, writer
 Abdur Rab Serniabat, cabinet minister, brother-in-law of Sheikh Mujibur Rahman
 Kaliprasanna Vidyaratna, scholar of Sanskrit

References

Sources 
Census figures for 1991, 2001 and 2011 are from Bangladesh Bureau of Statistics, Population Census Wing. The 2011 Census figures are based on preliminary results.

External links

 
Divisions of Bangladesh
Eastern Bengal